This is a list of shopping malls in Angola.

 Africa mall
 Belas Shopping – Angola's first mall which opened in 2007
 Complexo Multifuncional
 Fortaleza Shopping Centre
 Xyami – a chain which started constructing malls in 2015, including one which was Angola's biggest when it opened in Kilamba in 2017

References

Shopping Malls
Angola